The Bio-Strath Circuit  was a series tour of British tennis tournaments sponsored by the Swiss company Bio-Strath AG, a producer natural food supplements for sports people from 1970 to 1971. The circuit usually began in mid spring in April and ended in late summer in early August.

History
The Bio-Strath tennis circuit was a series tour of British tennis tournaments that was sponsored by the Swiss company Bio-Strath AG. the circuit was inaugurated in May 1970 with six Midland tournaments, and one South East tournament.
 
Each tournament being a particular leg on the circuit beginning with the 1st leg, that usually started around early April, and ending with the 10th and final leg around the first week of August. In 1971 the circuit was extended to include two new North West England tournaments at Lytham St Annes, and The Bio-Strath Northern at Manchester, one new tournament in South Yorkshire the Bio-Strath Sheffield Tournament at Sheffield,  another new event 

Another new tournament was added for London the Bio-Strath Cumberland Hard Courts, In South Wales the Bio-Strath Cardiff tournament was added to the circuit, and another new event for North East England, the Bio-Strath Sunderland and Durham tournament The same year the Edgbaston tournament in the West Midlands was withdrawn, and replaced by the Bio-Strath Stourbridge tournament. In October 1971 Bio-Strath AG decided not to renew its sponsorship agreement with tournaments, due to disagreements of prize money and the circuit was discontinued.

Results
1970 Bio Strath circuit
The Bio-Strath Circuit was part of the 1970 British Tournament Season. It began on 4 May in Birmingham, West Midlands, England with the first leg being the Bio-Strath Tally Ho event, and ended on 8 August with the tenth and final being the Bio-Strath West Warwickshire Open at Solihull.

1970 Men's

1970 Women's

1971  Bio Strath circuit
The Bio-Strath Circuit was part of the 1971 British Tournament Season. The first leg of the circuit began on 9 April with the Bio-Strath Tally Ho event, and ended on 7 August with the thirteenth and final leg the Bio-Strath West Warwickshire Open at Solihull.

1971 Men's
Incomplete roll

1971 Women's
Incomplete roll

Circuit tournaments
 Bio-Strath Cardiff.  (joined 1971)
 Bio-Strath Cumberland Hard Court Championships. (joined 1971)
 Bio-Strath Droitwich Hard Courts. 
 Bio-Strath Edgbaston. (left 1971)
 Bio-Strath London Hard Court Championships. 
 Bio-Strath Northern. (joined 1971)
 Bio-Strath Malvern. 
 Bio-Strath Sheffield Tournament. (joined 1971)
 Bio-Strath St Annes Open. (joined 1971)
 Bio-Strath Stourbridge Open. (joined 1971)
 Bio-Strath Sunderland and Durham. (joined 1971)
 Bio-Strath Tally Ho.
 Bio-Strath West Warwickshire Open.
 Bio-Strath Wolverhampton Open.

References

Defunct tennis tournaments in the United Kingdom
Defunct tennis tours